Nicolás Ariel Álvarez (born 22 January 1990) is an Argentine professional footballer who plays as a right-back for Defensores de Belgrano.

Career
Estudiantes of Primera B Metropolitana became Álvarez's first senior club in 2012, making his debut on 17 September in a goalless draw with Villa Dálmine. In his sixty-third appearance for the club, in 2014, Álvarez scored his first goal in a 3–1 win over Almirante Brown. In total, he scored two goals in one hundred and one appearances in three years with Estudiantes. In June 2015, Álvarez joined Primera B Nacional team Villa Dálmine. Thirty-eight appearances and two goals followed in two seasons. On 24 July 2016, Argentine Primera División side Olimpo signed Álvarez. He made a total of four appearances for Olimpo during 2016–17.

In August 2017, Álvarez agreed to sign for Los Andes in Primera B Nacional. His debut arrived during a 0–0 draw versus Deportivo Morón on 15 September. In total, Álvarez made eighteen appearances for Los Andes. On 5 June 2018, Álvarez joined Chacarita Juniors.

Career statistics
.

References

External links

1990 births
Living people
People from San Martín, Buenos Aires
Argentine footballers
Association football defenders
Primera B Metropolitana players
Primera Nacional players
Argentine Primera División players
Estudiantes de Buenos Aires footballers
Villa Dálmine footballers
Olimpo footballers
Club Atlético Los Andes footballers
Chacarita Juniors footballers
Defensores de Belgrano footballers
Sportspeople from Buenos Aires Province